= Monuafe island =

Former island in Tonga

Coordinates: 21°6′14.4″S 175°8′20.4″W

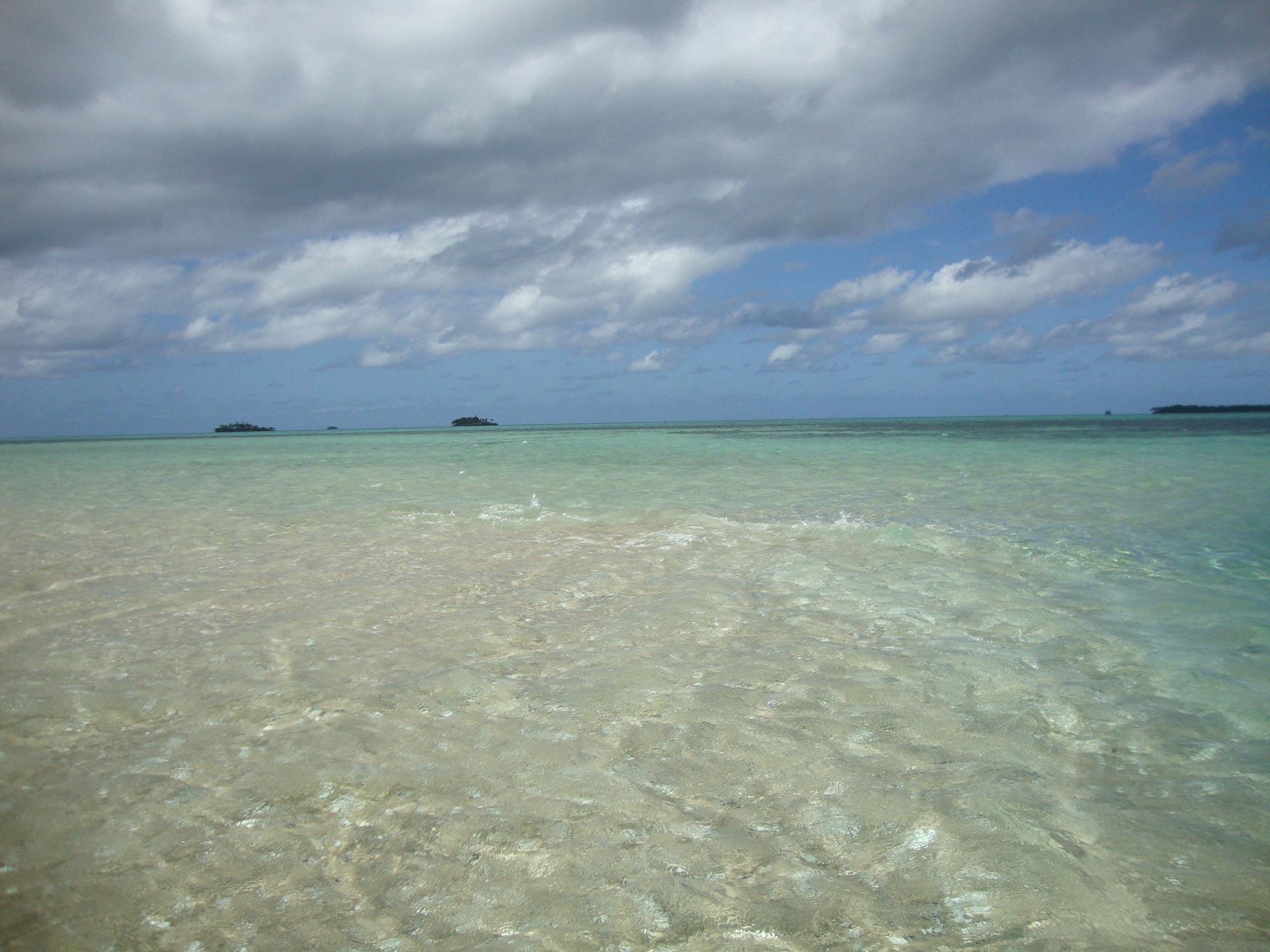
The remnants of the island Monūafe when it was finally reduced to a tidal flat by the sea.

Monuafe island was an islet located in Tonga. Erosion began in 2002 and the island was completely submerged in 2014.
